Cătălin Fercu (born 5 September 1986) is a Romanian rugby union player. He has played in 77 international matches for Romania scoring 28 tries and one penalty kick. Fercu plays at the fullback and wing positions.

He previously played for RC Timişoara, and made his European debut season in the 2005/2006 season as Bucharest played in the European Challenge Cup. Having scored a try in his first season better was to come in his second year in Europe scoring six tries in the group stages a great achievement however it was not enough to get Bucharest through their group and this prevented Fercu from potentially being the tournaments top try scorer. Such notable achievements in the 2006/2007 European Challenge Cup include a hat-trick of tries against French side Bayonne.

Fercu has also already made appearances on the international stage even at his young age and he played against France and Scotland in the Autumn internationals in 2006. He also scored a try against the French. Fercu helped guide Romania to the 2007 Rugby World Cup as he played in the qualifier matches including the vital games against Georgia and Spain and scored a try against Spain in the game that sealed their qualification to the Rugby World Cup.

Fercu was a late withdrawal from their Rugby World Cup squad because he was not prepared to fly all the way to New Zealand. The Romanian side arrived in Christchurch to prepare for their first game of the tournament against Scotland in Invercargill on 10 September without Fercu, who failed to get on the plane when it left Romania.

Fercu has been a player for Saracens since October 2014. He played in the winning Aviva A League team, Saracens Storm, as well as for the Saracens LV Cup winning team. On 28 March 2015, he made his debut in the Aviva Premiership against Harlequins 42-14 at the Wembley Stadium in London, England, in front of a world record breaking assistance of 84,068.

References

External links

 Cătălin Fercu at Timișoara Saracens website

1986 births
Living people
Romanian rugby union players
Rugby union fullbacks
Rugby union wings
Sportspeople from Brașov
Romania international rugby union players
București Wolves players
SCM Rugby Timișoara players
Romanian expatriate sportspeople in England
Expatriate rugby union players in England